Love Contractually is a 2017 Chinese romantic comedy film directed by Liu Guonan and starring Sammi Cheng and Joseph Chang. It was released in China by Horgos Bona Media and Huaxia Film Distribution on 14 February 2017.

Plot
Bo is the new assistant to Jin, a beautiful CEO, to be her sperm donor.  Throughout the movie Jin ended up falling for Bo.

In a trip to Paris, the pair is romantically involved. Jin gets pregnant but keep the end of her contract and went separate way with Bo. Bo goes to Paris again to discover the hidden truth

Cast
Sammi Cheng
Joseph Chang
Lam Suet
Feng Wenjuan
Xianzi
Jin Qiaoqiao
Terence Yin
Li Mao
Xu Dongdong

Reception
The film has grossed  in China.

References

External links 
 

Chinese romantic comedy films
2017 romantic comedy films
Polybona Films films
Huaxia Film Distribution films